Contrastive distribution in linguistics, as opposed to complementary distribution or free variation, is the relationship between two different elements in which both elements are found in the same environment with a change in meaning.

Phonology
In phonology, two sounds of a language are said to be in contrastive distribution if replacing one with the other in the same phonological environment results in a change in meaning. If a sound is in contrastive distribution, it is considered a phoneme in that language.

For example, in English, the sounds  and  can both occur word-initially, as in the words pat and bat (minimal pairs), which are distinct morphemes.

Note that two sounds that are in contrastive distribution in one language can be in complementary distribution or free variation in another. These sounds occur in English, as in the word team  and steam , but their occurrence is purely dependent upon phonological context.

Morphology

In morphology, two morphemes are in contrastive distribution if they occur in the same environment, but have different meanings.

For example, in Korean, noun phrases are followed by one of the various markers that indicate syntactic role: /-ka/, /-i/, /-(l)ul/, etc. /-ka/ and /-i/ are in complementary distribution. They are both used to indicate nominative case, and their occurrence is conditioned by the final sound of the preceding noun. If the noun ends in a consonant, /-i/ occurs; otherwise, /-ka/. /-(l)ul/, on the other hand, occurs in the same position as /-i/ or /-ka/ and is also conditioned by the immediately previous sound, but it indicates the accusative case. Therefore, /-(l)ul/ and the set {/-i/, /-ka/} are in contrastive distribution.

Syntax
In syntax, the requirements are similar. In English, the expression of the indicative and the subjunctive moods is contrastive:

(1) If I am a rich man, then I have a lot of money.
(2) If I were a rich man, then I would have a lot of money.

The change from non-past first-person singular indicative am to the subjunctive were results in a change in the grammatical mood of the sentence.

See also

 Allomorph
 Allophone
 Complementary distribution
 Free variation
 Minimal pair
 Phoneme
 Sociolinguistics
 Variable rules analysis

Phonology

ru:Дистрибуция#Типы дистрибуции